Bridget Malloy Kosierowski is an American politician. She is a Democrat who represents the 114th district in the Pennsylvania House of Representatives.

Political career

In March 2019, Kosierowski won a special election to represent the 114th district in the Pennsylvania House of Representatives, replacing Sid Michaels Kavulich, who had died of complications from open heart surgery. She currently serves on the following House committees:
 Appropriations
 Health
 Insurance
 Professional Licensure
Kosierowski is currently the only Registered Nurse serving in the Pennsylvania House of Representatives

Kosierowski won re-election in 2022.

Electoral record

Early life and education

Bridget Malloy Kosierowski was born in Clarks Summit, Pennsylvania. She graduated from Scranton Preparatory School in 1990 and received a Bachelor of Science in Nursing from Villanova University in 1994.

Career

Prior to elected office, Bridget Malloy Kosierowski worked as a Registered Nurse for 25 years.

Awards and honors

Kosierowski was named "2021 Legislator of the Year" by The Pennsylvania Society of Oncology and Hematology for her strong advocacy for pediatric cancer research and her work to bring forward a bipartisan bill supporting the largest effort to fund pediatric cancer research in the Commonwealth of Pennsylvania.

Kosierowski was honored as ‘State Official of the Year’ by Life Sciences Pennsylvania for her work as Covid-19 Vaccine Task Force member.

Named to the “Pennsylvania Healthcare Power 100” list by City & State PA, a news firm covering state and local government and politics in Pennsylvania in 2021.

Appointed by Pennsylvania Governor Tom Wolf to serve on his administration's COVID-19 Vaccine Joint Task force in February 2021.

The United Food and Commercial Workers Union 1176 honored Kosierowski for her advocacy and work to advance legislation that prioritized health and safety initiatives for essential workers during the COVID-19 pandemic in 2021.

Kosierowski was named "Woman of the Year 2022' by the Lackawanna County Federation of Democratic Women.

References

Democratic Party members of the Pennsylvania House of Representatives
Year of birth missing (living people)
Living people
Villanova University alumni
Nurses from Pennsylvania
People from Clarks Summit, Pennsylvania
Politicians from Lackawanna County, Pennsylvania